The Heroes of Telemark is a 1965 British war film directed by Anthony Mann based on the true story of the Norwegian heavy water sabotage during the Second World War from Skis Against the Atom, the memoirs of Norwegian resistance soldier Knut Haukelid. The film stars Kirk Douglas as Dr. Rolf Pedersen and Richard Harris as Knut Straud, along with Ulla Jacobsson as Anna Pederson. It was filmed on location in Norway.

Plot
The Norwegian resistance sabotage the Vemork Norsk Hydro plant in the town of Rjukan in the county of Telemark, Norway, which the Nazis are using to produce heavy water, which could be used in the manufacture of an atomic bomb.

Kirk Douglas plays Rolf Pedersen, a Norwegian physics professor, who, though originally content to wait out the war, is soon pulled into the struggle by local resistance leader Knut Straud (based on Knut Haukelid), portrayed by Richard Harris.

They both sneak out of Norway on a passenger steamship to Britain that they hijack so they can deliver microfilmed plans of the hydroelectric plant to the British. Then they return to Norway by parachute to plan a commando raid against the plant. When a British plane carrying a force of Royal Engineers to undertake the raid is shot down over Norway by the Germans, Pedersen and Straud lead a small force of Norwegian saboteurs into the plant. The raid is successful, but the Germans quickly repair the equipment.

The Germans then plan to ship steel drums of heavy water to Germany. Pedersen and Straud sabotage a ferry carrying the drums, and it sinks in the deepest part of a fjord.

Besides this sequence, the raids (Operations Grouse, Freshman and Gunnerside) and the final attack are filmed on-site, with mountainous and snowy Norwegian locations serving as a backdrop for the plot.

Cast

 Kirk Douglas as Dr Rolf Pedersen
 Richard Harris as Knut Straud
 Ulla Jacobsson as Anna Pedersen
 Michael Redgrave as Uncle
 David Weston as Arne
 Sebastian Breaks as Gunnar
 John Golightly as Freddy
 Alan Howard as Oli
 Patrick Jordan as Henrik
 William Marlowe as Claus
 Brook Williams as Einar
 Roy Dotrice as Jensen
 Anton Diffring as Major Frick
 Ralph Michael as Nilssen
 Eric Porter as Josef Terboven
 Wolf Frees as Sturmbannführer Knippelberg
 Karel Stepanek as Professor Hartmüller
 Gerard Heinz as Professor Erhardt
 Victor Beaumont as German Sergeant
 George Murcell as SS Oberscharführer
 Mervyn Johns as Col. Wilkinson
 Barry Jones as Professor Roderick Logan
 Geoffrey Keen as Gen. Bolt
 Robert Ayres as General Courts
 Jennifer Hilary as Sigrid
 Maurice Denham as Doctor
 David Davies as Captain of Galtesund
 Philo Hauser as Businessman
 Faith Brook as Woman on Bus
 Elvi Hale as Mrs. Sandersen
 Russell Waters as Mr. Sandersen
 Paul Hansard as German Officer (uncredited)
 George Roubicek as German Radio Operator (uncredited)
 Joe Dunne as Norwegian Quisling's Nazi (uncredited)

Production
Knut Haukelid wrote a memoir of the attack called Skis Against the Atom published in 1954. John Drummond wrote a novel based on the same story called But for These Men. Both books formed the basis of the screenplay.

The film was originally announced in 1963. It was made by Benton Film Productions, a company of director Anthony Mann and producer S. Benjamin Fisz. Financing came from America's Allied Artists and Britain's J Arthur Rank Productions.

Scenes early in the film when the main characters escape from occupied Norway were filmed around Poole and Hamworthy in Dorset with the former Channel Islands ship TSS Roebuck playing the role of the hijacked steamer. SF Ammonia was used to represent the train ferry SF Hydro in the final fjord scenes.

The movie was originally titled The Unknown Battle and was to have starred Stephen Boyd and Elke Sommer and be written by Ben Barzman. Later, Anthony Perkins was announced as a star, though he withdrew. Eventually Kirk Douglas signed as the lead. Cliff Robertson was mentioned as a possible co-star before Richard Harris came on board.

"I hear they are spending five million dollars, so it's got to be spectacular and that means more fiction and less fact", said Haukelid during filming.

Stephen Boyd later sued Mann for half a million dollars when funding for the initial project fell apart in early 1964. "I missed out on four good roles and plenty of money when he signed me without financial backing and then dropped the project", said Boyd later. "He asked me again later but I'd made other commitments, so Kirk Douglas and Richard Harris made it under another title."

Unlike the scenes in the film, the saboteurs had already left the area when the bomb exploded.  Also omitted is the death of 18 Norwegian civilians in the sinking and the rescue efforts of local fishermen.

Reception
It was amongst the 15 most popular films at the British box office in 1966. The film has a 67% rating in Rotten Tomatoes, based on six reviews, with an average rating of 6.10/10.

Other versions
Ray Mears made a documentary called The Real Heroes of Telemark.  Despite mainly sticking to the factual evidence, some scenes in the documentary, like the film, were partly dramatised, focusing more on the survival skills involved in the operation.

The same story was also covered in the 1948 Franco-Norwegian film Kampen om tungtvannet (La bataille de l'eau lourde — "The battle for heavy water"). Quite faithful to the real events, it even had many of the original Norwegian commandos starring as themselves.

In 2015, the Norwegian Broadcasting Corporation showed a TV series called Kampen om tungtvannet (also known as The Heavy Water War or The Saboteurs) based on the events.

See also
 Norwegian resistance movement
 Quisling regime
 List of World War II films

References

External links
 
 
 

1965 films
1965 war films
British war films
World War II films based on actual events
Western Front of World War II films
Films about Norwegian resistance movement
Norwegian resistance movement
Films directed by Anthony Mann
Films about nuclear war and weapons
Films scored by Malcolm Arnold
1960s English-language films
1960s British films